Jaroslav Brejcha is a former slalom canoeist who competed for Czechoslovakia in the 1960s. He won a gold medal in the C-2 team event at the 1965 ICF Canoe Slalom World Championships in Spittal.

References

External links 
 Jaroslav BREJCHA at CanoeSlalom.net

Possibly living people
Czechoslovak male canoeists
Year of birth missing
Medalists at the ICF Canoe Slalom World Championships